Hillister is an unincorporated community in southern Tyler County, Texas, United States.  It lies along the concurrent U.S. Routes 69 and 287 south of the town of Woodville, the county seat of Tyler County.  Although Hillister is unincorporated, it has a post office, with the ZIP code of 77624.

Hillister is the residence of State Representative James E. White of District 19, which encompasses Polk, Hardin, Jasper, Newton, and Tyler counties.

References

Unincorporated communities in Tyler County, Texas
Unincorporated communities in Texas